Optical Express is a provider of ophthalmology services including laser eye surgery, cataract surgery and lens replacement surgery in the United Kingdom and Europe. 

Optical Express is a trading name of DCM (Optical Holdings) Limited which operates as the Optical Express Group. In 2013 the company was described by the Competition Commission as the market leader in refractive surgery. As a chain of retail opticians, offering a number of healthcare services, the company once operated a private hospital in Manchester. This closed on 4 June 2015.

Financial history 

Accounts filed at Companies House for the calendar year 2011 reported a loss of £1.5 million, the previous year the company made a profit of nearly £6.9million.

In November 2012, Optical Express closed a subsidiary with 83 stores placed into administration and 40 store closures. In December 2012, Optical Express said it would open 40 new sites as laser consultation/treatment centres in 2013, which it later went on to do. Landlords expressed dismay that this closure happened two days after quarterly rents were due. Optical Express said it was consolidating its retail portfolio to "focus resources on its flagship locations and online business".

On 21 July 2013 Optical Express narrowly avoided being foreclosed by its lender Royal Bank of Scotland and Moulsdale averted administration by purchasing the bank's loans.

1 October 2013: Accounts filed at Companies House show DCM (Optical Holdings) recorded a pre-tax loss of £15.1m in the 12 months to 29 December 2012, wider than the £1.5m loss in the prior year. Founder David Moulsdale unveiled the intention to appoint an administrator for DCM Optical Clinic and then buy back 16 of the 19 stores.

Accounts filed for 27 December 2014 show a total revenue of £134m and an operating profit of £13m.

Operations

The Optical Express group of companies formerly operated in a range of healthcare services including the optical and cosmetic industries under the brand names Optical Express, The Dental Clinic, The Cosmetic Clinic and Bridgewater Hospital. The company now focuses follow on optical and refractive treatments.

The group was founded in 1991 by David Moulsdale with one Optical Express branch based in Leith, Edinburgh. The company grew steadily following its establishment, acquiring the 11 stores of Remocker Shapiro in 1995, and the 65 stores of Specialeyes PLC in 1997. These were followed in 2001 by 34 stores from Co-op Eyecare, and 14 more Scottish stores from Specdeals in 2002.

Optical Express entered the refractive eye surgery market in 2002 when it acquired The Health Clinic which offered general ophthalmic procedures across slightly less than 20 locations in the UK. In 2004 it acquired the ophthalmic treatment assets of Boots Group plc from nine sites in the UK. As a result of the acquisitions, the 700 employees were transferred to Optical Express bringing the total number of employees to 2,300 for Optical Express. The company did not acquire Boots' other optician assets.

In 2004, Optical Express acquired two Free Vision Euro Eyes laser vision correction clinics in Amsterdam and The Hague, marking the first large-scale UK optical chain to extend its laser vision correction business in the Netherlands. Optical Express acquired the dentistry and laser eye surgery services of Alliance Boots in 2005, trading under the name 'The Dental Clinic'. These assets were sold in 2013.

June 2010: Optical Express was criticised by Which? and BBC Watchdog. Which? criticized Optical Express, along with other laser eye surgery providers Optimax and Ultralase, focusing on the concern that laser counsellors consistently downplayed the risks of surgery

20 November 2013: British Member of Parliament John McDonnell introduced a Ten Minute Rule Bill into Parliament calling for regulation of the refractive eye surgery, including laser eye surgery. Among the concerns raised by McDonnell was misleading advertising and he used the 17 complaints about Optical Express to the Advertising Standards Authority in 2011 as an example.

November 2013: A Competition Commission report into the merger of two rival companies reported that Optical Express share of the laser eye surgery market was nearly twice the size, and in intraocular lens surgery six times as big as both Optimax and Ultralase combined, the report concluded that the merger of Optimax and Ultralase would not lessen competition in the market.

April 2014: A complaint by the company that rival Optimax had funded a protest website  owned by My Beautiful Eyes Foundation campaigner Sasha Rodoy was dismissed by Nominet.

September 2014: Optical Express was found guilty of failing to properly warn a patient of the risks involved in laser surgery and was ordered to pay £569,000 in damages.

January 2015: The Medicine and Healthcare products Regulatory Agency (MHRA) announced they were investigating claims that an artificial lens (MPlus X manufactured by Oculentis) implanted into the eyes of thousands of patients had caused serious problems with distance vision. Oculentis released a statement refuting allegations made in articles in the UK media about the lens causing severe vision loss, citing "significant factual innaccuracies" in the articles, claiming them to be "untrue" and "highly defamatory". As of September 2016, no official inquiry into the lens has been launched in the UK.

January 2015: following an article in the Observer newspaper and The Guardian online, the Daily Mail published an article claiming that blindness could result from lens implant surgery.

The company provides home eye tests for patients with complex disabilities and low vision across most of Scotland.

January 2017: Optical Express versus Associated Newspapers Ltd trial (re Daily Mail article in January 2015) set to commence in the Central London High Court on 12 June 2017.

August 2017: John Margetts, an Optical Express optometrist, was suspended for 12 months over claims that laser eye surgery was "mandatory" for RAF pilots. Mr Margetts was suspended from practice following a four-day hearing at the General Optical Council.
As of November 2020, Optical Express faced a legal challenge at the High Court from over 80 lens replacement customers who allegedly suffered complications.

Advertising
In 2007, the Advertising Standards Authority rejected a complaint that the claim "from only £395 per eye" featured in an Optical Express TV and leaflet campaign was misleading, and in 2011, the authority upheld a complaint about television advert featuring Pádraig Harrington, which was later replaced by one featuring the voice of Michael Gambon.

In 2011 the Advertising Standards Authority upheld 17 complaints about brochures.

In 2012 another TV advert was removed due to misleading content. and a complaint was partially upheld against the Optical Express website.

In January 2015 the Information Commissioners Office sent Optical Express an enforcement notice following 4,600 complaints regarding unsolicited messages

Charity
Optical Express has supported a number of charities. In 2004, the group donated funds to the Royal National Institute of Blind People (RNIB) to open an employment skills and rehabilitation facility for blind and partially sighted people.

In 2007, Optical Express formed a partnership with Glasgow-based charity organisation, The Caring City. Donated spectacles are distributed free of charge via local clinics to communities within Burundi.

Optical Express is also one of the main supporters of the annual Glasgow Taxi Outing, having been so since 2007. This event sees over 150 taxi drivers in the city dress up in fancy dress and take children with additional learning needs to the seaside for free, along with their parents and carers.

In 2014, Optical Express raised over £10,000 for the STV Appeal. In 2015, it raised over £100,000.

Optical Express has a long-standing relationship with global vision charity, Sightsavers. In 2014, the company and its staff helped to raise over £10,000 for the charity's Christmas Appeal. In 2016, Optical Express staff from its Lister Gate clinic took part in the obstacle course race Wolf Run at Stanford Hall, Leicestershire and raised over £1,200 for people who are going blind, or at risk of going blind, from preventable conditions.

In August 2016, Optical Express partnered with the charity Chernobyl Children's Life Line to provide free eye care for children from the contaminated area around the nuclear disaster site.

References

External links
 

Optics manufacturing companies
Eyewear companies of the United Kingdom
British companies established in 1991
Retail companies established in 1991
Eyewear retailers of the United Kingdom
Private providers of NHS services
Companies based in Glasgow
1991 establishments in the United Kingdom